Lebedodes johni is a moth in the family Cossidae. It is found in Kenya, where it has been recorded from Arabuko-Sokoke. The habitat consists of legume-dominated lowland woodlands.

The length of the forewings is about 11 mm. The forewings are deep olive-buff with a deep olive-buff spot near the end of the cell. The veins are pale olive-buff towards the termen and the terminal line is pale olive-buff. There is also a double subterminal line of same colour. The hindwings are pale olive-buff with darker veins.

Etymology
The species is named for John Albert Jones.

References

Natural History Museum Lepidoptera generic names catalog

Endemic moths of Kenya
Metarbelinae
Moths described in 2008